Lophiotoma friedrichbonhoefferi is a species of sea snail, a marine gastropod mollusk in the family Turridae, the turrids.

Description
The length of the shell varies between 35 mm and 50 mm.

Members of the species are predators and are benthic.

Distribution
This marine species occurs off the Philippines.

References

 Olivera. 2004. Larger forms in Lophiotoma defined: Four new species described from the Philippines and three from elsewhere in the Indo-Pacific. Science Diliman, 16 (1) : 1-28

friedrichbonhoefferi
Gastropods described in 2004